The ISO 2033:1983 standard ("Coding of machine readable characters (MICR and OCR)") defines character sets for use with Optical Character Recognition or Magnetic Ink Character Recognition systems. The Japanese standard JIS X 9010:1984 ("Coding of machine readable characters (OCR and MICR)", originally designated JIS C 6229-1984) is closely related.

Character set for OCR-A 
The version of the encoding for the OCR-A font registered with the ISO-IR registry as ISO-IR-91 is the Japanese (JIS X 9010 / JIS C 6229) version, which differs from the encoding defined by ISO 2033 only in the addition of a Yen sign at 5C.

Character set for OCR-B 
The version of the G0 set for the OCR-B font registered with the ISO-IR registry as ISO-IR-92 is the Japanese (JIS X 9010 / JIS C 6229) version, which differs from the encoding defined by ISO 2033 only in being based on JIS-Roman (with a dollar sign at 0x24 and a Yen sign at 0x5C) rather than on the ISO 646 IRV (with a backslash at 0x5C and, at the time, a universal currency sign (¤) at 0x24). Besides those code points, it differs from ASCII only in omitting the backtick (`) and tilde (~). An additional supplementary set registered as ISO-IR-93 assigns the pound sign (£), universal currency sign (¤) and section sign (§) to their ISO-8859-1 codepoints, and the backslash to the ISO-8859-1 codepoint for the Yen sign.

Character set for JIS X 9008 (JIS C 6257) 
JIS X 9010 (JIS C 6229) also defines character sets for the JIS X 9008:1981 (formerly JIS C 6257-1981) "hand-printed" OCR font. These include subsets of the JIS X 0201 Roman set (registered as ISO-IR-94 and omitting the backtick (`), lowercase letters, curly braces ({, }) and overline (‾)), and kana set (registered as ISO-IR-96 and omitting the East Asian style comma (､) and full stop (｡), the interpunct (･) and the small kana), in addition to a set (registered as ISO-IR-95) containing only the backslash, which is assigned to the same code point as in ISO-IR-93.

The JIS C 6527 font stylises the slash and backslash characters with a doubled appearance. The character names given are "Solidus" and "Reverse Solidus", matching the Unicode character names for the ASCII slash and backslash.

Character set for E-13B 

The ISO-IR-98 encoding defined by ISO 2033 encodes the character repertoire of the E13B font, as used with magnetic ink character recognition. Other registered labels include , its ISO-IR registration number, and simply .

The digits are preserved in their ASCII locations. Letters and symbols unavailable in the E13B font are omitted, while specialised punctuation for bank cheques included in the E13B font is added. The same symbols are available in Unicode in the Optical Character Recognition block.

References

External links 
 ISO 2033 distributed by ISO
 JIS X 9010 distributed by AFNOR

Character sets
2033
Optical character recognition
OCR typefaces